Fenris Glacier is a glacier in the Sermersooq municipality, Eastern Greenland.

This glacier is named after Fenris (Fenrir), the mighty wolf of Norse mythology.

Geography
The Fenris Glacier is located on the eastern side of the Greenland ice sheet, forming the boundary of the western and southwestern area of Schweizerland. It flows roughly southwards from the area of Gaule Bjerg, west of the Midgard Glacier and northeast of the Helheim Glacier. Its terminus is at the mouth of the Ningerti, one of the northernmost branches of Sermilik (Egede og Rothes Fjord), a large fjord system.

See also
List of glaciers in Greenland

References

External links
 TC - Freshwater flux to Sermilik Fjord, SE Greenland
 Fenris Glacier, Southeast Greenland on Vimeo
Glaciers of Greenland
Sermersooq